Michiyoshi Inoue (Japanese: いのうえ・みちよし, Chinese: 井上道義) (born on December 23, 1946) is a Japanese conductor. He is a recipient of the Cantelli Award.

Michiyoshi Inoue was born on December 23, 1946 in Tokyo, Japan.

In 1971 he was awarded the Cantelli Award for young conductors at the Teatro Coccia in Novara, Italy. In 1983 he became the director of the Japan Philharmonic Orchestra. Following this, he became the music director of the Tokyo Metropolitan Symphony Orchestra in 1990. He debuted in La Scala in 1971.

References

Japanese male conductors (music)
1946 births
Living people